James Iheakanwa, known professionally as B Wise, is a Nigerian Australian artist from Sydney, New South Wales.

He released his debut album Area Famous in 2018 via the label Elefant Tracks.

Biography
Iheakanwa was born and raised in Liverpool, New South Wales, the son of a Nigerian social worker and entrepreneur father and an Australian nurse and maternal support worker mother. The eldest of three children, Iheakanwa spent six months in Nigeria with his father when he was 12 years old, where he discovered hip-hop influences such as Tupac Shakur, but he was shaped by life in the southwest suburbs.

In July 2022, B Wise formed the group BBGB with BLESSED, Manu Crooks, Kwame and Lil Spacely. BBGB released their debut single "Tough Love" on 15 July 2022.

Advocacy
Alongside musicians Jack River and Ebony Boadu, Iheakanwa was a keynote speaker at the 2019 Conference for Young People in Sydney, in which he shared his experiences of how he got his start in the industry.

Discography

Studio albums

Extended plays

Singles

As lead artist

As featured artist

Notes

Awards and nominations

AIR Awards
The Australian Independent Record Awards (commonly known informally as AIR Awards) is an annual awards night to recognise, promote and celebrate the success of Australia's independent music sector.

! 
|-
! scope="row"| 2019
| Area Famous
| Best Independent Hip Hop/Urban Album
| 
| 
|}

APRA Awards
The APRA Awards are presented annually from 1982 by the Australasian Performing Right Association (APRA), "honouring composers and songwriters". They commenced in 1982.

! 
|-
| 2022 
| "Ezinna" by B Wise, Sampa The Great & Milan Ring (Nicholas Martin, Milan Ring, Sampa Tembo, Tung Yeng, James Iheakanwa)
| Song of the Year
| 
| 
|-

ARIA Music Awards
The ARIA Music Awards is an annual ceremony presented by Australian Recording Industry Association (ARIA), which recognise excellence, innovation, and achievement across all genres of the music of Australia. They commenced in 1987.

! 
|-
| 2021||  jamie || ARIA Award for Best Hip Hop Release || 
| 
|-

References

External links
 

Australian male rappers
Australian musicians
Australian record producers
Living people
Musicians from Sydney
Rappers from Sydney
Year of birth missing (living people)